Robert Leon Woodson Sr. (born April 8, 1937) is an American civil rights activist, community development leader, author, and founder and president of the Woodson Center. The Woodson Center is a non-profit research and demonstration organization that supports neighborhood-based initiatives to revitalize low-income communities. 

In February 2020, Woodson launched the Center's 1776 Unites campaign, to counter The 1619 Project.

Early life, family, and education 
Woodson was born in Philadelphia. His father died soon after and Woodson and his four siblings were raised by his mother. In 1954 he dropped out of high school to join the Air Force. While in the Air Force he passed the GED tests. After leaving the Air Force he went on to graduate from Cheyney University in 1962 with a Bachelor of Science in Mathematics and then from the University of Pennsylvania in 1965 with a Master of Social Work.

In 1977 Woodson married Ellen Hylton, and together they have raised four children: Robert Woodson Jr., Jamal Woodson, Tanya Woodson-Monestel, and Ralph Woodson. On February 8, 2003, his son, Robert L. Woodson Jr., was killed in an automobile accident. An award has been named for Woodson Jr. by the United States Department of Housing and Urban Development, where he had previously been employed.

Civil rights activism 
Robert Woodson has been actively involved in civil rights and community development since 1962.

Community development, 1962–1968 
While completing his graduate work, Woodson became actively involved in the civil rights movement, directing and coordinating community development programs for a number of local and national organizations, including the NAACP.

Unitarian Services Committee, social worker, Boston, 1968–1971 
After resigning from the NAACP, Woodson moved to Boston, where he spent three years as a social worker with the Unitarian Services Committee.

National Urban League, Administration of Justice Division, director, New York City, 1971–1973 
As a director of the National Urban League, Woodson began to develop a strategy to reduce crime by strengthening community institutions that were closest to the problems of high-crime areas.

American Enterprise Institute, 1974–1981 
Woodson continued to develop the idea of neighborhood empowerment during his time as director of the American Enterprise Institute's Neighborhood Revitalization Project in Washington, DC. He then became an adjunct fellow providing technical support and advice to community groups.

Neighborhood empowerment movement 
Woodson's strategy of neighborhood empowerment is to seek solutions to the problems of low-income communities among what he calls the social entrepreneurs that are indigenous to these communities. Rather than a poverty program directed by some government agency, Woodson's program seeks out families in these troubled neighborhoods that have prospered and persevered to learn from their success.

Opposition to the Law Enforcement Assistance Administration 
In 1973 Vernon Jordan, head of the Urban League, and Representative John Conyers, chair of the U.S. House subcommittee on crime in the Judiciary Committee, supported Woodson's opposition to vesting more power to Justice agencies as a solution to crime; that a better solution was focusing on neighborhood empowerment.

Center for Neighborhood Enterprise (CNE) 
In 1981 Woodson founded the CNE (Now the Woodson Center) to promote "self-help" solutions in low income neighborhoods by promoting and supporting indigenous leaders in those neighborhoods.

Violence-free zones 
The CNE created the Violence-Free Zones program to reduce the level of violence in schools and help at-risk youth escape the life of violence and crime.

Woodson Center 
On November 15, 2016, the Center for Neighborhood Enterprise was rebranded as the Woodson Center as a tribute to Founder and President, Robert Woodson, Sr.

"1776 Unites" campaign 
In February 2020, The Woodson Center launched the 1776 Unites campaign, with the support of scholars, journalists, and entrepreneurs like Carol Swain, Glenn Loury, John Sibley Butler, Clarence Page, Wilfred Reilly, Robert Cherry, and Coleman Hughes, among others. Woodson has stated that his central motivation in founding 1776 Unites was to counter the "lethal" narratives embedded in the 1619 Project. "This garbage that is coming down from the scholars and writers from 1619 is most hypocritical because they don't live in communities [that are] suffering," he said. In an interview with Fox News host Mark Levin, Woodson called the 1619 Project's thesis "one of the most diabolical, self-destructive ideas that I've ever heard". He argued that the assumptions behind the 1619 Project are actually a form of "white supremacy" as they are predicated on black Americans having no agency and being incapable of overcoming adverse circumstances.

Awards
 1990 MacArthur Fellows Program MacArthur "Genius" award
 2008 Bradley Prize
 2008 Presidential Citizens Award
 2008 Social Entrepreneurship Award from the Manhattan Institute

Works (selection)
 "Red, White, and Black: Rescuing American History from Revisionists and Race Hustlers", Robert L. Woodson Sr. (editor, essays by twenty authors), Emancipation Books, May 18, 2021 
 
 
 Youth Crime and Urban Policy, A View From the Inner City, American Enterprise Institute for Public Policy Research, 1981, 
 On the Road to Economic Freedom: An Agenda for Black Progress, Editor Robert L. Woodson, Regnery Gateway, 1987, 
 A Summons to Life, Mediating Structures and the Prevention of Youth Crime, Ballinger Pub. Co., 1981, 
 The Triumphs of Joseph: How Today's Community Healers are Reviving Our Streets and Neighborhoods, Simon and Schuster, 1998, 
 Black Perspectives on Crime and the Criminal Justice System: A Symposium, editor Robert L. Woodson, G. K. Hall, 1977,

Honorary degrees 

 University of Cincinnati, Cincinnati, OH, Honorary Doctorate, 2012 (Doctor of Humane Letters)
 Colorado Christian University, Denver, CO, Honorary Doctorate, 2010 (Doctorate of Humanities)

References

External links
 Woodson Center
 1776 Unites
 
 

1937 births
American Enterprise Institute
American social workers
Cheyney University of Pennsylvania alumni
Living people
MacArthur Fellows
People from Philadelphia
United States Air Force airmen
University of Pennsylvania School of Social Policy and Practice alumni
Presidential Citizens Medal recipients